Finis Dee Pollock (September 24, 1937 – December 27, 2005) was an American film and television actor. He was known for playing Billy Urchin in the American western television series Gunslinger.

Life and career 
Pollock was born in Alhambra, California, the son of Lucia Curtwright and Robert Pollock. He attended Mark Keppel High School. He began his acting career in 1951, appearing in the western television series The Adventures of Kit Carson. Pollock then appeared in the film The Blue Vail, In 1952, he made appearances in the films The Old West, Beware, My Lovely, Park Row, and It Grows on Trees.

Pollock guest-starred in television programs including Gunsmoke, Bonanza, Wagon Train, 12 O'Clock High, Johnny Ringo, Outlaw, Tales of Wells Fargo, Perry Mason, The Virginian and The Fugitive. In 1961, he joined the cast of the new CBS western television series Gunslinger, playing the role of Billy Urchin. Pollock appeared in the films Carousel (as Enoch Snow Jr.), Take a Giant Step, Captain Apache, The Lineup, The Legend of Tom Dooley, The Plunderers and The Wayward Bus. In 1970, he played the role of Jones in the film Kelly's Heroes. His final film credit was from the 1972 film Embassy.

Pollock retired from acting in the early 1970s. In 1989, he moved to Chico, California to look after his mother.

Death 
Pollock died in December 2005 of a heart attack in Chico, California, at the age of 68.

References

External links 

Rotten Tomatoes profile

1937 births
2005 deaths
People from Alhambra, California
Male actors from California
American male film actors
American male television actors
20th-century American male actors
Western (genre) television actors